Aleksandar Jovanović (born 25 July 1992) is a Serbian football goalkeeper who plays for Timok.

References

External links
 
 

1992 births
People from Zaječar
Living people
Serbian footballers
Association football goalkeepers
FK Timok players
FC Guria Lanchkhuti players
FK Olimpik players
FK Rudar Kakanj players
FK Dinamo Vranje players
Serbian First League players
Erovnuli Liga players
Premier League of Bosnia and Herzegovina players
First League of the Federation of Bosnia and Herzegovina players
Serbian expatriate footballers
Expatriate footballers in Georgia (country)
Serbian expatriate sportspeople in Georgia (country)
Expatriate footballers in Bosnia and Herzegovina
Serbian expatriate sportspeople in Bosnia and Herzegovina